Polysilynes are organosilicon compounds with the formula [RSi]n.  Although their name suggests a relationship to alkynes, polysilynes are a class of silicon-based random network polymers primarily composed of tetrahedral silicon centers, each connected to one carbon and three Si centers. These compounds are prepared by Wurtz coupling of alkyltrichlorosilanes (RSiCl3):  
3 Na  +  RSiCl3   →   [RSi]n  +  3 NaCl

The methyl and hexyl derivatives have been described. Poly(methylsilyne) (PMSy) is a dark yellow powder. With some solvents (tetrahydrofuran, ether, toluene etc.) it forms a colloidal suspension that is clear and non-viscous, which may then be deposited as a film or coating on various substrates. Upon thermolysis, poly(methylsilyne) decomposes to silicon carbide.  The optical properties of these materials has attracted attention.

References

Silanes
Organosilicon polymers